
S T U V W X Y Z

S

Sa – Sc – Si – So – St – Sy

Sa
 Sabar – drumming style found in Senegal
 Sacred Harp – a tradition of sacred choral music that originated in New England and was later perpetuated and carried on in the American South.
 Sadcore – a style of alternative rock characterized by bleak lyrics that are delivered by either upbeat or downbeat melodies.
 Salsa dura – a style of salsa music that places more emphasis on the instrumental part of the music.
 Salsa music – a fusion of multiple Cuban- and Puerto Rican-derived popular music genres from immigrants in New York City.
 Salsa romántica – a soft, romantic form of salsa music.
 Saltarello
 Samba – a form of Brazilian popular music and dance characterized by its 2/4 time signature varied with the conscious use of a sung chorus to a batucada rhythm. Considered a symbol of Brazil and the Brazilian Carnival. 
 Samba-canção – traditional samba in slow tempo and with romantic lyrics. influenced by bolero
 Samba-reggae – a genre of samba with a choppy, reggae-like rhythm.
 Samba rock – a style of samba that contains rock music instrumentation, funk basslines, and soul music vocals.
 Sambai
 Sambass
 Sampledelia – any music which heavily utilize sampling (i.e. electronic music and/or hip hop music).
 Sampling – reusing a portion of a sound recording in another recording; considered a foundation of hip hop music.
 Sanjo – Korean instrumental folk music
 Sârbă – Romanian folk dance style
 Sardana – Traditional Music of Catalonia
 Sato kagura
 Sawt – urban music from Kuwait and Bahrain
 Saya – Bolivian music derived from African rhythms

Sc
 Schlager music
 Schottische
 Scottish Baroque music
 Scottish folk music – folk music of the Scottish people; part of the Celtic music umbrella.
 Scrumpy and Western – folk music from West Country of England
 Screamo – an aggressive style of emo which employs screamed vocals
 Sea shanty – English folk music of the sea
 Sean-nós singing – type of traditional Irish singing
 Seapunk
 Second Viennese School
 Sega music
 Seggae
 Seis – type of Puerto Rican dance music
 Semba – traditional type of music from Angola
 Sephardic music
 Serialism
 Sertanejo music – folk music from the East of Brazil
 Set dance
 Sevdalinka – Bosnian urban popular music
 Sevillana
 Shabda
 Shalako – Armenian folk dance
 Shan'ge – Taiwanese Hakka mountain songs
 Shango
 Shibuya-kei
 Shidaiqu – Hong Kong-based form of traditional music updated for pop audiences and sung in Mandarin
 Shima-uta – folk songs from the Amami Islands, Japan
 Shock rock
 Shoegazing – a style of Neo-psychedelia characterized by an ethereal mixture of obscured vocals, guitar distortion and effects, feedback, and overwhelming volume.
 Shoka – Japanese songs written during the Meiji Restoration to bring Western music to Japanese schools
 Shomyo – Japanese Buddhist chanting
 Shota – Albanian folk dance
 Show tune

Si
 Sica
 Siguiriyas
 Silat – Malaysian mixture of music, dance and martial arts
 Sinawi – Korean religious music meant for dancing; it is improvised and reminiscent of jazz
 Singer-songwriter
 Ska – a Jamaican music genre that combined elements of Caribbean mento and calypso music with American jazz and rhythm and blues;  characterized by a walking bass line accented with rhythms on the off beat.
 Ska punk – fusion of punk rock and ska
 Skald
 Skate punk – Punk rock subgenre that features elements of hardcore punk, melodic hardcore and pop punk. Popular amongst skaters, surfers or skiers
 Skweee - a musical style, with origin in Sweden and Finland.
 Skiffle
 Skyladiko pop folk music style of Greece
 Skullstep
 Slack-key guitar (kihoalu) – Hawaiian form invented by retuning open strings on a guitar
 Slängpolska
 Slide music
 Slowcore – a fusion of indie rock and sadcore. As its name applies, slowcore tends to deliver the bleak lyrics of sadcore with downbeat melodies and slow tempo.
 Sludge metal – a subgenre of heavy metal with slow-tuned tempos, abrasive distortion and harsh vocals. Basically a fusion of doom metal and hardcore punk
 Smooth jazz
 Smooth soul – a style of soul music characterized by melodic hooks, funk influence (specifically its beat) and smooth production.

So
 Soca music
 Soft rock – an offshoot of pop rock that relies on simple, melodic songs with big, lush productions.
 Son-batá (batá rock music)
 Son cubano
 Son montuno – Cuban folk music
 Sonata
 Songo music – a mixture of changuí and son montuno
 Songo-salsa – a mixture of songo, hip hop and salsa
 Sophisti-pop – British pop music made in the 1980s that incorporated elements of jazz and soul music (specifically their usage of the brass section); known for its extensive use of the synthesizer.
 Soukous - Various ensemble sizes may be used, with upwards of three guitars sometimes employed simultaneously. Prominent horn and vocal arrangements are occasionally incorporated as well.
 Soul blues – a style of electric blues that incorporates elements of soul music, particularly its tense and raw vocals.
 Soul jazz
 Soul music – a popular African-American music genre that combines gospel music and rhythm and blues (as in the blues style); known for its tense and raw vocals which are backed by a brass section.
 Sound poetry
 Soundtrack
 Southern Gospel
 Southern Gothic music – a style of alternative country lyrically inspired by the Southern Gothic literary genre.
 Southern Harmony
 Southern hip hop – hip hop music originating from the American South (especially Atlanta, New Orleans, Houston, Memphis, and Miami). The most popular form of hip hop as of late.
 Southern metal
 Southern rock – roots rock originating from the American South that usually contains long jam sessions centered on the boogie rhythm.
 Southern soul – soul music originating from the American South that usually has a stronger gospel influence and overall deeper sound than other soul.
 Sovietwave
 Space age pop – a subgenre of pop music and easy listening inspired by and associated with the space age of the 1950s and 1960s.
 Space disco
 Space music – a subgenre of new-age music meant to evokes a feeling of contemplative spaciousness.
 Space rock – an offshoot of psychedelic rock characterized by loose and lengthy song structures centered on instrumental textures that typically produce a hypnotic, otherworldly sound.
 Spectralism
 Speedcore
 Speed metal
 Spirituals – a genre of African-American Christian music linked with the hardships of slavery; serves the basics of both blues and gospel music.
 Spoken word – any audio that features vocals that is neither singing or rapping.
 Spouge – Barbadian folk music
 Sprechgesang
 Square dance

St
 St. Louis blues – a form of blues developed in St. Louis that tends to be more piano-based than others.
 Steelband
 Stoner metal
 Stoner rock
 Straight edge music
 Strathspey
 Stride
 String music – Thai pop music
 String quartet
 Sufi music
 Suite
 Sunshine pop – a style of pop music developed in California that combined the nostalgic moods of easy listening with an appreciation for the beauty of the world.
 Suomirock
 Super Eurobeat
 Surf music
 Swamp blues – a style of blues developed in Baton Rouge that is heavily influenced by Zydeco and Cajun music.
 Swamp pop – a style of pop music developed by Cajun teenagers in the 1950s that combines Cajun music with rock and roll and rhythm and blues (specifically New Orleans rhythm and blues).
 Swamp rock – a fusion of rockabilly, soul music, swamp blues, country music and funk.
 Swing – 1. a general "feel" of the rhythm within jazz musicians; 2. a specific rhythm pattern that involves alternately lengthening and shortening the pulse-divisions in a rhythm.
 Swing music – a danceable form of jazz that place heavy emphasis on both definitions of swing, which is what the form is named after.

Sy
 Sygyt – type of xoomii (Tuva throat singing), likened to the sound of whistling
 Symphonic black metal
 Symphonic metal
 Symphonic poem
 Symphonic rock
 Symphony
 Synth-pop – a style of new wave music and a form of electronic music that centers on the synthesizer as the dominant musical instrument. Originally an intentionally cold sounding genre, later synth-pop artists incorporated elements of pop music into it, resulting in a more upbeat sound.
 Synth-punk – a style of punk rock that uses synthesizers rather than guitars. Sometimes considered a form of electronic rock.
 Synthwave - a style of  music that takes most of its inspiration from synth music and pop culture from the 1980s. Musically, synthwave is often instrumental and has a "futuristic" theme, with large, throbbing, retro synths
 Syrian chant – chant used in Syriac Christianity.

T
 Taarab
 Tai tu – Vietnamese chamber music
 Taiwanese opera
 Taiwanese pop – early Taiwanese pop music influenced by enka and popular with older listeners
 Tala – a rhythmic pattern in Indian classical music
 Talempong – a distinct Minangkabau gamelan music
 Talking blues
 Tamborito – Folk music style from Panama
 Tambu – music genre and dance form, found on Aruba, Bonaire and Curaçao
 Tamburitza
 Tamil Christian keerthanai – Christian devotional lyrics in Tamil
 Táncház – Hungarian dance music
 Tango music – Argentine and Uruguayan popular music that spread internationally in the 1920s
 Tanguk – a form of Korean court music that includes elements of Chinese music
 Tappa
 Taqwacore
 Tarana – style of music from northern India using highly rhythmic nonsense syllables
 Tarantella
 Taranto
 Tech house
 Tech trance
 Technical death metal
 Technical metal
 Techno – a style that emerged from Detroit, Michigan known for its repetitive rhythm.
 Technoid
 Techstep
 Techtonik
 Tecno brega
 Teen pop – A subgenre of pop music targeted towards pre-teen and teenage listeners
 Tejano music or "Tex-Mex" – an American form of Norteño originating among the Mexican-American populations of Central and Southern Texas; considered a part of American folk music.
 Third Stream – jazz and classical music fusion style.
 Tembang sunda – Sundanese sung free verse poetry
 Texas blues – a form of blues developed in Texas that originally had swing influences, but later became a form of blues rock.
 Theatre music – music made for performance in theatres.
 Theme music
 Thillana – form of vocal music from South India using highly rhythmic nonsense syllables
 Third wave ska
 Thirty-two-bar form
 Thrashcore
 Thrash metal – a style of extreme metal known for its fast tempos, screaming vocals, extended guitar solos and aggressive lyrics.
 Thumri – a type of popular Hindustani vocal music
 Tibetan pop – pop music heavily influenced by Chinese forms, emerging in the 1980s
 Tientos – style of organ music from the 15th century in Spain
 Timbila – form of folk music in Mozambique
 Tin Pan Alley – a name given to the collection of New York City music publishers and songwriters who dominated the popular music of the United States in the late 19th century and early 20th century; one of the major sources for traditional pop.
 Tinku – traditional music and dance from Potosi Bolivia
 Toeshey – Tibetan dance music
 Togaku
 Tondero – folk music style from Peru
 T'ong guitar – acoustic guitar pop music of Korea
 Traditional bluegrass – modern bluegrass music that emphasizes its original elements.
 Traditional Nordic dance music – upbeat style of Nordic folk
 Traditional pop – pop music that predates the existence of rock and roll; usually has a swing influence due to that genre's prominence at that time. Later classified as a form of easy listening.
 Trallalero – Genoese urban songs
 Trance music – a style of electronic dance music characterized by a tempo lying between 110 and 150 bpm (BPM), repeating melodic phrases, and a musical form that distinctly builds tension and elements throughout a track often culminating in 1 to 2 "peaks" or "drops".
 Trap music (EDM)
 Trap music (hip hop)
 Trival
 Tribal house
 Trikitixa – Basque accordion music
 Trip hop – a hip hop-influenced genre of electronic music that is known for its melancholy sound and a bass-heavy drumbeat. Sometimes treated as a synonym for downtempo, it differs from that genre by having a more "earthy" sound.
 Tropicalia
 Tropical music – Latin music originating from the Caribbean.
 Tropical house – a mix of reggae and house sounds originated in the late 2000s
 Tropipop
 Truck-driving country
 Tumba
 Turbo-folk – aggressive form of modernized Serbian music
 Turntablism - music produced by flipping a record to produce a rhythm 
 Tuvan throat-singing
 Twee pop
 Twelve-bar blues – a distinctive form predominantly based on the I-IV-V chords of a key.
 Twist (also a dance style, early 1960s)
 Two-tone (usually spelled 2 Tone) – a style of ska that incorporates elements of punk rock and new wave music, particularly their high-paced tempo; produced by and named after the record label of the same name, most two-tone music tends to have lyrics that promotes racial harmony.

U
 UK bass – club music that emerged in the United Kingdom during the mid-2000s under the influence of genres such as house, grime, dubstep, UK garage, R&B, and wonky.
 UK garage – a style of electronic music and an offshoot of garage house that usually features a distinctive 4/4 percussive rhythm with chopped up vocal samples.
 UK hardcore
 UK hard house
 Unblack metal – black metal with lyrics that praise Christianity rather than criticizing it as opposed to black metal, which traditionally focuses on Satanism or anti-Christianity
 Underground music - music with practices perceived as outside, or somehow opposed to, mainstream popular music culture
 Uplifting trance
 Urban Cowboy a soft, mellow style of music that uses harmonious vocals with smooth synth sounds or rarely no music at all.
 Urban Pasifika — a blend of hip-hop, reggae, and traditional Polynesian musical styles

V
 Vallenato – accordion-based Colombian folk music
 Vaporwave
 Vaudeville – a form of theatre featuring unrelated acts, including performers of popular and/or classical music, that became a popular form of entertainment in the United States until the rise of film.
 Verbunkos – Hungarian dance music 
 Verismo
 Video game music – Melodic music as defined by its media.
 Viking metal
 Villanella – 16th century Neapolitan songs
 Virelais
 Visual Kei – Japanese music scene, created around the 1980s
 Visual music
 Vocal house
 Vocal jazz
 Vocal music
 Vocaloid- a singing/voice -synthesis- (or emulation) software, which as it implies does not just consist in sound banks but voice synthesis algorithms that can be used with different kinds of voice.
 Volksmusik

W
 Waila (chicken scratch) – a Tohono O'odham fusion of polka, norteño and Native American music
 Walking bass – a style of bass accompaniment which creates a feeling of regular quarter note movement, akin to the regular alternation of feet while walking.
 Wall of Sound – a music production technique developed by Phil Spector in which a large number of musicians (including an orchestra) perform the same parts in unison and the resulting sound is re-recorded in an echo chamber. Used mostly by Spector himself for artists signed to his pop music label, along with some rock acts inspired by this style of production (most notably Brian Wilson of the Beach Boys).
 Waltz
 Wangga – Australian aboriginal music genre
 Warabe uta
 Wassoulou music- performed mostly by women. Some recurring themes in the lyrics are childbearing, fertility, and polygamy. Instrumentation includes soku, djembe drum, kamalen n'goni, karinyan and bolon.
 War song
 Waulking song - Scottish folk songs, typically sung in Gaelic. These songs were often sung by women as they worked to soften woven tweed by hitting it against a solid surface, which would give the song rhythm.
 Were music - indigenous Yoruba music
 West Coast blues – a form of jump blues developed in California by Texas blues musicians that move there.
 West Coast hip hop – hip hop music originating from the western United States (largely Los Angeles); the first form of hip hop not to originate from the East Coast.
 West Coast jazz
 Western blues
 Western swing – an up-tempo danceable form of country music that is heavily influenced by swing music.
 Witch house
 Wizard rock – geek rock that's specifically about Harry Potter.
 Women's music or womyn's music, wimmin's music—1970s lesbian/feminist
 Wong shadow – 1960s Thai pop music
 Wonky- music with shaky off kilter beats that came out of the 90s
 Work song
 Worldbeat – a music genre that combines rock and pop music with music that is usually labeled as world music.
 World music – music originating outside the Western world (although the term has occasionally been applied to various forms of Western folk music). This may also include Latin music, music from the Caribbean, and regional forms of Western popular music that are performed in non-Western languages but are otherwise nearly indistinguishable in style.

X
 Xenomania - a music style created by Brian Higgins that has usually a strange and crazy feel to it
 Xoomii- a style of music which is produced by rolling the throat in ways to create an instrument like sound to it
 Xote – is a Brazilian music genre and dance for pairs or groups of four.
 Xhosa music
 Xylophonecore- xylophone music mixed with electronic

Y
 Yass – a style of Polish music from the 1980s and 1990s.
 Yayue
 Yé-yé - French music that emerged from the 60s
 Yo-pop - a style of music, popularized in the 1980s by Segun Adewale.
 Yodeling
 Youth crew
 Yukar

Z
 Zajal
 Zamacueca – Peruvian folk dance of African origins and precursor of Zamba
 Zamba – Argentinian folk dance and music genre
 Zamrock
 Zapin – derived from ancient Arabic music, zapin is popular throughout Malaysia
 Zarzuela – a form of Spanish operetta
 Zeuhl
 Zeibekiko – Greek Dance 9/8 Rytmus
 Zef – South African music based in both rap & rave
 Ziglibithy - music from the Côte d'Ivoire made by people like Ernesto Djedje
 Znamenny chant – a unison, melismatic chant used in the Russian Orthodox Church.
 Zouglou
 Zouk – French Caribbean (Guadeloupean) dance music
 Zouk Love – performed at a slower tempo than traditional zouk music (between 95 and 100bpm) and is smoother, more sentimental and quieter overall. 
 Zulu music
 Zydeco – a style of music that tends to blend with other largely danceable genres and is centered on the accordion and the washboard.

Previous sections
 Section A–F | Section G–M | Section N–R